Nudie may refer to:

Nudie Jeans
Nudie Juice, Australian juice producer
Helen Barbara Kruger, fashion designer also known as Bobbie Nudie
Nudie Cohn, fashion designer born as Nuta Kotlyarenko

See also
Nude (disambiguation)